Mont-lès-Neufchâteau (literally Mont near Neufchâteau) is a commune in the Vosges department in Grand Est in northeastern France.

See also
Communes of the Vosges department
Fort de Bourlémont

References

Communes of Vosges (department)